James Brander Forsyth  (October 25, 1809 – March 8, 1872) was a Massachusetts physician and politician who served as a city councilor, alderman and as the sixth Mayor of Chelsea, Massachusetts.

Notes

1809 births
1872 deaths
Physicians from Massachusetts
Harvard Medical School alumni
Massachusetts city council members
Mayors of Chelsea, Massachusetts
People from Farmington, Maine
19th-century American politicians